Mònica Miquel i Serdà (18 November 1962 – 24 January 2023) was a Spanish politician. A member of the Initiative for Catalonia Greens, she served in the Congress of Deputies from 2003 to 2004.

Miquel died in Cubelles on 24 January 2023, at the age of 60.

References

1962 births
2023 deaths
Initiative for Catalonia Greens politicians
Members of the 7th Congress of Deputies (Spain)
Women mayors of places in Spain
21st-century Spanish politicians
21st-century Spanish women politicians
Mayors of places in Spain
Women members of the Congress of Deputies (Spain)
Politicians from Barcelona